II Anti-Aircraft Corps (II AA Corps) was a high-level formation of Britain's Anti-Aircraft Command from 1940 to 1942. It defended the Midlands and North West of England and Wales during the Blitz and the middle years of the Second World War.

Origin
AA Command had been created in 1938 to control the Territorial Army's rapidly-expanding anti-aircraft (AA) organisation within Air Defence of Great Britain. On the outbreak of war in September 1939, it commanded seven AA Divisions, each with several AA Brigades, disposed around the United Kingdom. Continued expansion made this organisation unwieldy, so in November 1940 – during the Luftwaffe'''s nightly Blitz on London and other British cities – five further AA Divisions were organised, and all the divisions grouped under three corps headquarters directly subordinate to AA Command. II AA Corps covered the Midlands and North West of England and North Wales, and by February 1941 comprised four AA divisions and 14 brigades. Its boundaries roughly coincided with No. 9 Group RAF and No. 12 Group RAF of RAF Fighter Command.Frederick, p. 1047.

Order of battle
II AA Corps had the following organisation from February 1941:Farndale,  Annex D, pp. 257–9.Order of Battle of Non-Field Force Units in the United Kingdom, Part 27: AA Command, 12 May 1941, The National Archives (TNA), Kew file WO 212/79.Order of Battle of Non-Field Force Units in the United Kingdom, Part 27: AA Command, 14 May 1942, TNA file WO 212/81.

Corps HQ: Hucknall, Nottinghamshire

General Officer Commanding: Lieutenant-General M. F. Grove-WhiteFarndale, Annex J.

2nd AA Division
 32nd (Midland) Anti-Aircraft Brigade (East Midlands, sector layout)
 40th Anti-Aircraft Brigade (Airfields, sectors)
 41st (London) Anti-Aircraft Brigade (East Anglia, sectors)
 50th Light Anti-Aircraft Brigade (Derby, Nottingham)
 66th Anti-Aircraft Brigade  formed by May 19414th AA Division
 33rd (Western) Anti-Aircraft Brigade (Liverpool)
 44th Anti-Aircraft Brigade (Manchester)
 53rd Light Anti-Aircraft Brigade (North Midlands, sectors)
 70th Anti-Aircraft Brigade joined in late June 194110th AA Division
 31st (North Midland) Anti-Aircraft Brigade (West Yorkshire, sectors)
 39th Anti-Aircraft Brigade (Humber, Scunthorpe)
 62nd Anti-Aircraft Brigade (Leeds, Sheffield)
 70th Anti-Aircraft Brigade joined in early June 1941, then moved to 4 AA Div11th AA Division
 1st Anti-Aircraft Brigade (Crewe, sectors) War Office reserve; left AA Command by May 1941 34th (South Midland) Anti-Aircraft Brigade (Birmingham, Coventry)
 54th Anti-Aircraft Brigade (West Midlands, Gun Defence Areas, sectors)
 67th Anti-Aircraft Brigade  formed by May 1941 68th Anti-Aircraft Brigade  formed by May 1941Intermediate Ammunition Depots
 Rainford, St Helens
 Barlow, near Selby
 Bletchley (27 ASD; controlled by War Office)
 Weedon Ordnance Depot

Equipment Ammunition Magazines
 Paull Point, near Hull
 New Holland, Lincolnshire
 Leeds (Morley) 
 Sheffield North
 Manchester (Barton)
 Liverpool (Laysbrook)
 Upton, Birkenhead
 Market Drayton, Shropshire
 Coventry (Foleshill)
 Hampton-in-Arden, Warwickshire
 Birmingham (Newtown)
 Derby (Findern)

Operations
As soon as it was organised, II AA Corps had to deal with the 1940–41 Blitz on industrial cities and towns such as Barrow-in-Furness, Birmingham, Coventry, Derby, Hull, Leeds, Liverpool, Manchester, Nottingham and Sheffield. The corps was responsible for large Gun Defence Areas (GDAs) around Merseyside, Humberside and South Yorkshire, and the North and West Midlands, with 'Indicator Belts' and 'Killer Belts' of searchlights in between, the former working with the GDAs and RAF Sectors, the latter with the night fighters in the air. Redeployment was called for in 1942 when the Luftwaffe began the 'Baedeker raids' on towns and cities such as Norwich, King's Lynn and York that had previously warranted little AA defence.

Disbandment
The AA Corps and Divisional HQs were disbanded in October 1942 and a replaced by a more flexible system of AA Groups, each aligned with a Group of RAF Fighter Command. The area covered by II AA Corps became the responsibility of two of the new groups: 4th AA Group (North Wales and North West England) with 9 Group RAF, and 5th AA Group (North East England) with 12 Group RAF.Routledge, p. 401 & Map 36.

Notes

References

 Gen Sir Martin Farndale, History of the Royal Regiment of Artillery: The Years of Defeat: Europe and North Africa, 1939–1941, Woolwich: Royal Artillery Institution, 1988/London: Brasseys, 1996, .
 J.B.M. Frederick, Lineage Book of British Land Forces 1660–1978, Vol II, Wakefield, Microform Academic, 1984, .
 Brig N.W. Routledge, History of the Royal Regiment of Artillery: Anti-Aircraft Artillery 1914–55'', London: Royal Artillery Institution/Brassey's, 1994, 
 Sir Frederick Pile's despatch: "The Anti-Aircraft Defence of the United Kingdom from 28th July, 1939, to 15th April, 1945" London Gazette 18 December 1947

External sources
 British Military History
 Generals of World War II

Corps of the British Army in World War II
Air defence units and formations of the British Army
Military units and formations in Nottinghamshire
Military units and formations established in 1940
Military units and formations disestablished in 1942